Hudson David Yang (born October 24, 2003) is an American actor. From 2015 to 2020, he starred as the lead, Eddie Huang, in the ABC television series Fresh Off the Boat.

Early life and education
Yang was born on October 24, 2003 in New York City, New York, to Jeff Yang, a Taiwanese American writer, journalist, businessman, and business/media consultant, and Heather Ying, a Taiwanese American physician assistant who worked in cardiothoracic surgery.

Up until 2015, Yang attended NEST+M (New Explorations into Science Technology + Math) and The New York Performing Arts Academy's "FutureStar" Program.

In 2021, he was admitted to the Harvard University class of 2025.

Career

On May 9, 2014, he was interviewed by the Angry Asian Man as the Angry Reader of the Week, where he joked "it's all about the bling - cha-ching, cha-ching". Fresh Off the Boat, adapted from the memoir by chef Eddie Huang, was picked up by ABC on May 10, 2014, and premiered on February 4, 2015 with the first of the two preview episodes garnering 7.93 million viewers, becoming the second highest rated comedy premiere that season. 

He appeared on The View on February 3, 2015 ahead of the show's debut and portrayed Henry in the mystery drama film The Sisterhood of Night.

In 2018, Yang and his father invested in a Vietnamese restaurant in Los Angeles, California.

Filmography

Awards and nominations

References

External links

 
 

American male actors of Chinese descent
American male actors of Taiwanese descent
21st-century American male actors
American male child actors
Living people
American male television actors
2003 births
American male film actors
Male actors from New York City